A Very Natural Thing is a 1974 American film directed by Christopher Larkin and starring Robert Joel, Curt Gareth, Bo White, Anthony McKay, and Marilyn Meyers. The plot concerns a gay man named David who leaves a monastery to become a public school teacher by day, while looking for true love in a gay bar by night.

One of the first films about gay relationships intended for mainstream, commercial distribution, its original title was For as Long as Possible. It was released to lukewarm reviews in 1973 and given an R rating by the Motion Picture Association of America.

Plot
The film begins as a mini-documentary of New York City's 1973 Gay Pride parade and rally, with a young lesbian unabashedly declaring, "being gay is a very natural thing." The action cuts to the protagonist, David (Robert Joel), going through the ritual of being released from his vocation as a monk in a monastery. He then is seen as a public school teacher of English Literature in the New York City area, who spends his time off driving into the city to be with his "oldest friend from Schenectady," Alan (Jay Pierce) at a gay bar. One evening at the bar, David is singled out to dance by Mark (Curt Gareth), who portrays a businessman. They end up spending the night together, which at first seems like a one-night stand until David says he'd like to see Mark again, and Mark agrees. Not long after, the pair begin a monogamous relationship, and David moves in with Mark. But when Mark wants to have sex with other men, the relationship starts to break down. He rejects the idea of modeling a gay relationship on heterosexual marriage, and he is irritated that David wants to "keep pushing this romantic thing." Mark would rather have an understanding that either of them can have sex with other men when they feel like it, but this ends up alienating them from each other. Mark refuses to say, "I love you" until David playfully wrestles with him and tells him, "Say it...again...once more for good measure." After a year, though, David realizes that the two of them are just marking time. The two go to Fire Island for a weekend in an attempt to spice up their relationship, and although David tries to please Mark by entering an orgy, he can't go through with it. After a fight, David temporarily moves in with his friend Alan, who gives David an objective perspective on what happened. In a later encounter with Mark at Coney Island, David finally realizes that there can't be a reconciliation, as Mark is more interested in sex than a romantic relationship.

After a season of loneliness, David meets a divorced photographer named Jason (Bo White) at the 1973 Gay Pride rally which began the film. David and Jason go to Jason's apartment and talk. In Jason, a divorced dad, we meet another member of the gay community, one who was living a heterosexual life prior to coming out. He still socializes with his ex-wife, who goes with him on photo shoots. On a parental visit with their toddler son (P.J.) Jason tells his ex-wife that he is now seeing someone with whom he would be spending the upcoming Labor Day holiday. It appears that in Jason, David has found someone willing to pursue a romantic, committed relationship with him. Jason takes pictures of David while telling him things to say other than "cheese', and the film ends by showing the two men together splashing naked in the surf on Cape Cod.

Cast
 Robert Joel as David
 Curt Gareth as Mark
 Bo White as Jason
 Anthony McKay as Gary, David's roommate
 Marilyn Meyers as Valerie, Gary's fiancée
 Jay Pierce as Alan, David's friend
 Barnaby Rudge as Langley
 A. Bailey Chapin as the minister
 Scott Eisman as a student
 Michael Kell as father of boating family
 Sheila Rock as mother of boating family
 Linda Weitz as Linda, their daughter
 Robert Grillo as Edgar, David's friend
 Kurt Brandt as Edgar's lover Charles
 George Diaz as Miguel, one of Alan's lovers
 Deborah Trowbridge as Jason's ex-wife
 Jesse Trowbridge as P.J., Jason's son
 Vito Russo

Critical reaction
A Very Natural Thing was seen as the gay response to Love Story (1970), the film famous for the phrase, "Love means never having to say you're sorry." Similarly, Mark tells David, "Love means never having to say you're in love," and a montage of the two men rolling down a leaf-covered hill, quietly lying together at home, and being in love mimics a montage of the heterosexual couple in Love Story. Both films argued for an unconventional alternative to traditional marriage, despite a commitment. David tells Jason that he is committed to him, but that this commitment is based on wanting to be together, not having to be together. The ending is very optimistic, which was out of the ordinary for gay relationship films until then. Earlier films were dominated by tales of gays and lesbians being outcasts of society, mentally disturbed or committing suicide; later films were sadly dominated by the emergence of AIDS. A Very Natural Thing thus represents a short period in time where gay liberation flourished, and filmmakers could explore relationships in much the same way that films with heterosexual characters did.

The film was one of the first mainstream films to show homosexuality as a valid and normal act of love, i.e. "a very natural thing," as it attempted to explore the options for gay couples in 1973, including footage of an actual Gay Pride celebration. Many heterosexual film critics felt that the film's depiction of love between two men as romantic made the film automatically "an argument rather than an entertainment" (The New York Post). The film showed a young gay couple going through many of the same rituals and facing many of the same challenges as a straight couple.

Some gay film critics felt that film was not political enough: that the characters were too apolitical, too middle class and that, by rejecting the philosophy of free love or sexual liberation, the film was rejecting what some gay activists felt was a necessary value of the new gay liberation movement.

Larkin responded to the criticism by saying, "I wanted to say that same-sex relationships are no more problematic but no easier than any other human relationships. They are in many ways the same and in several ways different from heterosexual relationships but in themselves are no less possible or worthwhile". Incidentally, Vito Russo, who wrote The Celluloid Closet appears in A Very Natural Thing.

The film was not financially successful, and the director, Christopher Larkin, moved to California, where in 1981 he published the book The Divine Androgyne According to Purusha. Larkin committed suicide on June 21, 1988.

Availability
The film was released in VHS in 1996, it has recently been released on DVD: a 25th Anniversary edition in 1999 by Waterbearer Films, Inc.

See also
 List of American films of 1974
 List of American films of 1973

References

External links
 
 

1973 films
1973 LGBT-related films
American LGBT-related films
Gay-related films
1970s English-language films
1970s American films